Deng Yuanzhao or Deng Fa (March 7, 1906 – April 8, 1946) was an early leader of the Chinese Communist Party. He was born in Yuncheng District, Yunfu, Guangdong, and participated in the Canton–Hong Kong strike and the Guangzhou Uprising in his youth. He later engaged in underground work in Guangzhou and Hong Kong for the CCP, and become Party Committee Secretary of Guangzhou and Hong Kong and head of the Organisation Department in Guangdong. After 1931, he was active in the Jiangxi–Fujian Soviet and worked as the Party Committee Secretary of Fujian, and head of the State Political Security Bureau. He later assisted in the war, becoming the Political Director of the Shaan-Gan Army's 3rd Column, in charge of the secret police. His handling of the position earned him the nickname of China's Dzerzhinsky; he was present in the Long March. During the Second Sino-Japanese War, he was appointed representative of the CCP to Xinjiang, and among other positions, became the fifth president of the Party School of the Central Committee of the Chinese Communist Party, the highest training center for party workers and leaders. Deng served as principal from 1939 to 1942. He died in a plane crash in 1946, along with other senior Communist leaders including Ye Ting, Bo Gu, and Wang Ruofei.

References

External links
Archives from the University of Heidelberg

1906 births
1946 deaths
Chinese Communist Party politicians from Guangdong
Politicians from Yunfu
Republic of China politicians from Guangdong
Victims of aviation accidents or incidents in China